Vicente Ballester Martínez (born 20 June 1980 in Castellón de la Plana) is a former Spanish racing cyclist.

Palmarès
2007
3rd Clásica de Almería

References

1980 births
Living people
Spanish male cyclists
Cyclists from the Valencian Community
Sportspeople from Castellón de la Plana